Euxoa ochrogaster, the red-backed cutworm, is a moth of the family Noctuidae. It is found from Iceland and northern Europe, through the Baltic to the Amur region. In North America, it is found from Alaska to Newfoundland and Labrador, south into the northern part of the United States, south in Rocky Mountains to Arizona and New Mexico.

Adults are on wing from the end of July to beginning of September.

The larvae feed on a variety of broad leaf plants and grasses, including Plantago species. The species is economically important on Helianthus annuus in North America.

The moths can be affected by a fungus Tarichium megaspermum (from order Entomophthorales), in British Columbia, Canada.

Subspecies
Euxoa ochrogaster ochrogaster
Euxoa ochrogaster islandica (Iceland)
Euxoa ochrogaster rossica (Lithuania to Amur)

References

External links
Fauna Europaea
Images
Moths of North Dakota

Euxoa
Moths described in 1852
Moths of North America
Moths of Europe
Moths of Asia
Moths of Iceland